John Ormsby Evelyn Vandeleur, DSO and Bar (14 November 1903 – 4 August 1988), usually known as Joe Vandeleur from his initials, was an Anglo-Irish British Army officer who served in the Second World War.

Early life
Born in Nowshera in British India (now Pakistan), Vandeleur was the son of Colonel Crofton Bury Vandeleur and Evelyn O'Leary. His family was originally from Kilrush, County Clare, where they were the local landlords.

Military career

He was commissioned into the Irish Guards as a second lieutenant in 1924, serving in Sudan and Egypt before the war.

As commanding officer of the 3rd Battalion, Irish Guards, he led the breakout of XXX Corps during Operation Market Garden. His second cousin Lieutenant-Colonel Giles Vandeleur (their grandfathers were brothers) was acting commanding officer of the 2nd Armoured Battalion, Irish Guards. He went on to command the 129th Infantry Brigade and 32nd Guards Brigade. He retired from the Army in 1951.

After military service
Vandeleur acted as a military consultant to the production of the 1977 feature film A Bridge Too Far. Michael Caine played Vandeleur and Michael Byrne played Giles Vandeleur.

His memoirs A Soldier's Story were privately printed by Gale & Polden in 1967.

Later life and death
He married Felicity Bury-Barry, who died in 1948. He later married Norah Christie-Miller (who was a Vandeleur cousin on her mother's side).

After the war, Vandeleur resided in a manor house in Pinkneys Green, near Maidenhead in Berkshire.

He died in Maidenhead in 1988 and was buried in Brookwood Cemetery. His grave is marked by a simple headstone inscribed only "J.O.E. V. 1903 – 1988" and underneath "Once an Irish Guardsman".

See also
Joe's Bridge, the nickname given to Bridge No.9 on the Maas–Scheldt Canal in the Belgian city of Lommel just south of the Belgian–Dutch border.

References

Bibliography

External links
Generals of World War II
Irish Guards site
WW2 – A Peoples War

Irish Guards officers
British Army brigadiers of World War II
1903 births
1988 deaths
People from Nowshera District
Burials at Brookwood Cemetery
Sudan Defence Force officers
Companions of the Distinguished Service Order
Military personnel of British India